Cérès was an 18-gun Etna-class corvette of the French Navy, launched in 1795. Begun in 1794 as Courageuse, the corvette was renamed Cérès in May 1795 and launched the same month. In 1797, she was again renamed, as Enfant de la Patrie. She was wrecked on the shores of Norway on 17 February 1798.

Notes, citations, and references
Notes 

Citations

References
  (1671-1870)

Age of Sail corvettes of France
1795 ships
Ships built in France
Etna-class corvettes
Maritime incidents in 1798
Shipwrecks of Norway